Swindled or Taken In is a 2004 Spanish-French thriller film directed by Miguel Bardem which stars Ernesto Alterio, Victoria Abril, and Federico Luppi.

Plot 
After a time learning the ropes with aging Manco, swindler Ernesto ends up teaming up with alpha conman Federico. Federico's former lover Pilar persuades the former to pull a large-scale scam.

Cast

Production 
The screenplay was written by Carlos Martín and Miguel Bardem. A Spanish-French co-production, the film was produced by Alquimia Cinema and Mandarin Films in association with Telemadrid, Canal 9, Canal+, and TVE. Shooting locations included Madrid, and the province of Segovia.

Release 
The film was presented in the official selection of the 7th Málaga Film Festival in April 2004. Distributed by Hispano Foxfilm, it was theatrically released in Spain on 9 July 2004.

Reception 
Todd Brown of ScreenAnarchy pointed out that even if the film would have benefited from giving the characters "a little [more] time to pause and breathe", "it is nonetheless an entertaining caper film, one in which nothing is ever quite as it seems".

Jonathan Holland of Variety deemed the "effective but inelegant grifters" film to be as "hyperactive, ostentatious and hollow as the characters it describes", and unable to hold after its first hour.

Mirito Torreiro of Fotogramas rated the film 3 out of 5 stars, deeming it to be "an entertaining device to narrate an already-seen story, but to which Bardem's narrative pulse gives a good rhythm", otherwise singling out a "splendid" Victoria Abril as the film's standout.

Accolades 

|-
| align = "center" rowspan = "3" | 2005 || rowspan = "3" | 19th Goya Awards || Best Editing || Iván Aledo ||  || rowspan = "3" | 
|-
| Best Original Song || "Corre" by Bebe || 
|-
| Best Sound || Jaime Fernández, Pierre Lorraine, Polo Aledo || 
|}

See also 
 List of Spanish films of 2004

References 

Films shot in Madrid
Films shot in the province of Segovia
2000s Spanish films
2000s French films
Spanish thriller films
French thriller films
2000s Spanish-language films